Elections to Newham London Borough Council were held in May 1971.  The whole council was up for election. Turnout was 27.3%. This election had aldermen as well as councillors. Labour won all ten aldermen positions.

Background
A total of 142 candidates stood in the election for the 60 seats being contested across 24 wards. 2 seats in one ward went unopposed. Candidates included a full slate from the Labour Party, while the Liberal and Conservative parties stood 8 and 21 respectively. Other candidates included 42 Residents & Ratepayers, 3 Communists and 2 National Front.

Election result

|}

Results by ward

Beckton

Bemersyde

Canning Town & Grange

Castle

Central

Custom House & Silvertown

Forest Gate

Greatfield

Hudsons

Kensington

Little Ilford

Manor Park

New Town

Ordnance

Park

Plaistow

Plashet

St Stephens

South

Stratford

Upton

Wall End

West Ham

Woodgrange

By-elections between 1971 and 1974

Custom House & Silvertown

References

1971
1971 London Borough council elections